Buccinoidea is a taxonomic superfamily of very small to large predatory sea snails, marine gastropod mollusks.

This superfamily is in the clade Neogastropoda according to the taxonomy of the Gastropoda (Bouchet & Rocroi, 2005). It had been placed within the infraorder Neogastropoda according to the taxonomy of the Gastropoda (Ponder & Lindberg, 1997).

Families
These  families are within Buccinoidea in the taxonomy of the Gastropoda by Bouchet & Rocroi (2005):
 Austrosiphonidae Cotton & Godfrey, 1938
 Belomitridae Kantor, Puillandre, Rivasseau & Bouchet, 2012
 Buccinanopsidae Galindo, Puillandre, Lozouet & Bouchet, 2016
 Buccinidae Rafinesque, 1815
 Busyconidae Wade, 1917 (1867)
 Chauvetiidae fam. nov.
 Colubrariidae Dall, 1904
 Columbellidae Swainson, 1840
 Dolicholatiridae fam. nov.
  † Echinofulguridae Petuch, 1994
 Eosiphonidae fam. nov.
 Fasciolariidae Gray, 1853
 Melongenidae Gill, 1871 (1854)
 Nassariidae Iredale, 1916 (1835)
 Pisaniidae Gray, 1857 
 Prodotiidae fam. nov.
 Retimohniidae  Kantor, Fedosov, Kosyan, Puillandre, Sorokin, Kano, R. Clark & Bouchet, 202
 Some genera are treated as unassigned within the superfamily Buccinoidea
Families brought into synonymy
 Anachidae Golikov & Starobogatov, 1972: synonym of Columbellidae Swainson, 1840
 Buccinulidae Finlay, 1928: synonym of Buccinulini Finlay, 1928
 Cominellidae: synonym of Buccinidae Rafinesque, 1815
 Nassidae Swainson, 1835: synonym of Nassariidae Iredale, 1916 (1835)
 Neptuneidae Stimpson, 1865: synonym of Buccinidae Rafinesque, 1815
 Peristerniidae Tryon, 1880: synonym of Peristerniinae Tryon, 1880
 Pyrenidae Suter, 1909: synonym of Columbellidae Swainson, 1840

References

 Bouchet P. & Rocroi J.-P. (2005). Classification and nomenclator of gastropod families. Malacologia. 47(1-2): 1-397 .

 
Neogastropoda
Taxa named by Constantine Samuel Rafinesque